Gannon Conway (born June 4, 1989) is an American football defensive end who is a free agent. He attended Arizona State University and signed with the Miami Dolphins as an undrafted free agent in 2014.

High school & college
Conway attended Higley High School. In 2006, the football team earned both First-team All-State Offense and First-team All-Region Defense, and went to the state championship game. He was also a member of the wrestling team, and took second in state wrestling in 2007. Conway then attended Mesa Community College from August to December 2008, and helped the team become Valley of the Sun Bowl Champions. He enrolled at Arizona State University in 2010 as a walk-on, and was awarded a scholarship in 2011. Conway played in 30 games for ASU, recording 51 tackles, 9 tackles for loss, 5.5 sacks, and 2 passes defensed.

Professional career
Conway signed with the Miami Dolphins as an undrafted free agent on May 13, 2014, and was released three days later. On June 11, he signed with the Indianapolis Colts, and was waived on July 15. On August 11, he re-signed with the Colts, and was waived on August 30. On January 15, 2015, Conway signed to the Colts' practice squad, and four days later he signed a reserve/future contract.

Personal life
Conway lived in the Dominican Republic from 2008 to 2010, and is fluent in Spanish. Gannon also has a song written about him by his own brother about how bad he is at Halo. It is outrageous how bad he is at Halo.

References

External links
 Gannon Conway profile at Colts.com
 Gannon Conway profile at TheSunDevils.com

1989 births
Living people
Players of American football from Arizona
Sportspeople from Arizona
American football defensive ends
Arizona State Sun Devils football players
Miami Dolphins players
Indianapolis Colts players